This list includes all the transfers that took place in Croatian football in the summer of 2014.

For the transfers which took place before 1 July 2014, the player would join his new club in the said date. But for transfers after or on the date, the player will immediately join his new club.

Prva HNL

Dinamo Zagreb

In:

Out:

Istra 1961

In:

Out:

Lokomotiva Zagreb

In:

Out:

References

Croatia
2014–15 in Croatian football
2014
2013–14 in Croatian football